Wolseley may refer to:

People
Sir Charles Wolseley, 2nd Baronet (c. 1630–1714), English politician
Sir Charles Wolseley, 7th Baronet (1769–1846), English landowner and political agitator
Frances Garnet Wolseley, 2nd Viscountess Wolseley (1872–1936), English gardener
Frederick Wolseley (1837–1899), Irish-born Australian woolgrower and inventor of sheep shearing machinery
Garnet Wolseley, 1st Viscount Wolseley (1833–1913), Irish-born British field marshal, elder brother of Frederick Wolseley
George Wolseley (1839–1921), British Indian army officer
Pat Wolseley, British botanist
Sir Reginald Wolseley, 10th Baronet (1872–1933), emigrated to the US and initially refused the title 
Viscount Wolseley
Wolseley baronets

Businesses
all taking their name from  Frederick Wolseley (1837–1899)
 The Wolseley, a restaurant at 160 Piccadilly, London, in the former showroom of the Wolseley Motors building
 The Wolseley Sheep Shearing Machine Company, a British manufacturer of sheep shearing and other machinery, now Wolseley plc
 Wolseley plc, a UK-based multinational building supplies company, previously The Wolseley Sheep Shearing Machine Company
 Wolseley UK, the UK subsidiary of Wolseley plc
 The Wolseley Tool and Motor Car Company, automobile manufacturer spun off to Vickers, Sons & Maxim renamed Wolseley Motors in 1914
 Wolseley Motors, automobile manufacturer, owned in turn by Vickers, W R Morris, Morris Motors, BMC and British Leyland

Electorates
Wolseley (Manitoba electoral district), provincial electorate in Manitoba
Wolseley (Saskatchewan electoral district), former provincial electorate in Saskatchewan
Qu'Appelle-Wolseley, former provincial electorate in Saskatchewan

Settlements
Rural Municipality of Wolseley No. 155, Saskatchewan, Canada
Wolseley, Saskatchewan, a town within the rural municipality
Wolseley, South Australia, a town and former railway junction
Wolseley, Staffordshire, an area within the parish of Colwich, including Wolseley Hall and Wolseley Centre
Wolseley, Western Cape, a town in South Africa
Wolseley, Winnipeg, Canada, a neighborhood of Winnipeg, Manitoba

Other locations
Wolseley Battery, a coastal battery in Malta
Wolseley Buttress, a place in Antarctica
Wolseley River, a river in Ontario, Canada
Wolseley Road, a residential street in Sydney, Australia
Wolseley Hall, a demolished stately home in Staffordshire, England, subsequently the location of the Wolseley Centre

Surnames of English_origin